Obleukhov (masculine) or Obleukhova (feminine) is a Russian last name, a variant of Ableukhov. The following people bear this last name:
Timofey Obleukhov, Russian cast member in the Hot Ice Show, a long-running ice show in the United Kingdom

References

Notes

Sources
И. М. Ганжина (I. M. Ganzhina). "Словарь современных русских фамилий" (Dictionary of Modern Russian Last Names). Москва, 2001. 

Russian-language surnames
